The Miss Ecuador 1983 was held on June 14, 1983. There were 18 candidates competing for the national title. At the end of night Jacqueline Burgos from Guayas crowned Mariela del Mar García Monsalve as Miss Ecuador 1983. The Miss Ecuador competed in Miss Universe 1983.

Results

Placements

Special awards

Contestants

Notes

Returns

Last compete in:

1974
 Tungurahua

1975
 Azuay

Withdrawals

 Bolívar
 Galápagos
 Imbabura
 Los Ríos
 Napo
 Pichincha

External links

Miss Ecuador
1983 beauty pageants
Beauty pageants in Ecuador
1983 in Ecuador